The Santa Rita Experimental Range and Wildlife Area is the longest continuously active rangeland research facility and among the five oldest biological field stations in the United States. Located south of Tucson in Pima County, Arizona, the 52,000 acre Santa Rita Experimental Range (SRER) was founded in 1903 and administered by the United States Forest Service until 1987, when the University of Arizona College of Agriculture took over administration of the site. The mission at the SRER is "to advance research and education on the ecology and management of desert rangelands through the secure, long-term access to research areas, state-of-the-art facilities, new discoveries, and research legacies."

Environmental data 

The SRER makes available several spatial and time series data sets for research purposes including monthly resolution precipitation data from 1922 to present, long term vegetation response studies, and livestock grazing histories. Additionally, the SRER maintains a repeat photography archive, allowing researchers to visually inspect land cover and landscape changes for 117 locations from as early as 1902 to present. The National Ecological Observatory Network also publicly publishes data collected on the range.

Gallery

See also

 Santa Rita Mountains
 Madera Canyon (Arizona)
 Continental, Arizona

References

External links

Biological stations
Wildlife areas of Arizona
Protected areas of Pima County, Arizona
Protected areas of the Sonoran Desert
1903 establishments in Arizona Territory
Buildings and structures in Pima County, Arizona
History of Pima County, Arizona
Santa Rita Mountains
University of Arizona
Protected areas established in 1903
Research forests